South Ascrib is an island in Loch Snizort  between the Waternish and Trotternish peninsulas on the northern coasts of the island of Skye in Scotland.

Other islands in the same group as South Ascrib are Eilean Creagach, Eilean Iosal, Sgeir à Chapuill and Sgeir à Chuin. The skerry of Scalp Rock lies just west of South Ascrib.

In 1703, Martin Martin wrote: "About 5 leagues to the south-west from Tulm lies the island Ascrib, which is divided into several parts by the sea; it is about two miles in compass, and affords very good pasturage; all kinds of fish abound in the neighbouring sea. On the south-west side of the isle Ascrib, at the distance of two leagues, lie the two small isles of Timan, directly in the mouth of Loch Arnizort; they are only fit for pasturage." There are indications of an underground monk's cell on the island dating from the 18th century.

South Ascrib has been designated as part of a Special Area of Conservation, owing to its significant breeding colonies of the common seal. About 600 of these seals reside there, which is about 35% of this seal's breeding population in the area of Skye, and about 1% of its population in the entire European Union. Puffin also breed in burrows on the Ascribs.

In 1985, the Ascribs were purchased by Baron Palumbo. At the time, he said he intended to build an underground house on South Ascrib, but he ended up building a structure of traditional design. The islands were offered for sale again in 1996.

Notes

External links

Landforms of the Isle of Skye
Uninhabited islands of Highland (council area)